In cricket, a player is said to have scored a century when he scores 100 or more runs in a single innings. Test cricket, the longest version of the game, involves two innings per side in a match. An individual scoring centuries in each innings of a Test match is considered a "milestone" by critics. Players from all teams that are full members of the International Cricket Council (ICC) except Ireland and Afghanistan have scored centuries in both innings of a Test.

The first player to score centuries in both innings of a Test match was Warren Bardsley of Australia, who made 136 and 130 against England in August 1909. Since then, the feat has been accomplished by 72 players on 90 occasions . India's Sunil Gavaskar and Australians Ricky Ponting and David Warner are the only cricketers who have scored two centuries in a match on three occasions, while 11 players have achieved the feat twice. England's Graham Gooch has the highest aggregate in a match while scoring centuries in both the innings; his combined tally of 456 runs in the match333 in the first and 123 in the second inningswas entered into The Guinness Book of Records as "Most runs scored by a player in a Test match (male)". His feat of scoring a triple century and a century was subsequently equalled, though with lower scores, by Kumar Sangakkara: while six other players have scored a double century and a single century in the match. Allan Border is the only player to have scored 150 (or more) in each innings. Sri Lanka's Aravinda de Silva is the only player to remain not out in both innings.

There have been five instances of two players performing the feat in the same matchDenis Compton (England) and Arthur Morris (Australia) in 1947, Australia's Greg Chappell and Ian Chappell (against New Zealand) in 1974, Asanka Gurusinha (Sri Lanka) and Andrew Jones (New Zealand) in 1991, Pakistan's Azhar Ali and Misbah-ul-Haq (against Australia) in 2014, and David Warner (Australia) and Virat Kohli (India) in 2014.

West Indies' Lawrence Rowe (1972) and Pakistan's Yasir Hameed (2003) are the only debutants to score centuries in both innings of a Test match and Andy Flower of Zimbabwe is the only player to achieve the feat as a designated wicket-keeper.

Key

Table

Notes

References

Bibliography

Test, both innings
Test centuries, both innings
Centuries, both innings
Test, both innings